The 1977–78 Eintracht Frankfurt season was the 78th season in the club's football history. In 1977–78 the club played in the Bundesliga, the top tier of German football. It was the club's 15th season in the Bundesliga.

Matches

Legend

Friendlies

Bundesliga

League fixtures and results

League table

Results summary

Results by round

DFB-Pokal

Intertoto Cup

Table

UEFA Cup

Squad

Squad and statistics

|}

Transfers

In:

Out:

Sources

External links
 Official English Eintracht website 
 German archive site 

1977-78
German football clubs 1977–78 season